The 42nd National Hockey League All-Star Game took place in Chicago Stadium, home of the Chicago Blackhawks, on January 19, 1991.

Commissioner's Choice
The 1991 game saw much controversy in team selection, as Wales head coach Mike Milbury included enforcer Chris Nilan and checker Brian Skrudland ahead of scorer Kirk Muller and retiring legend Guy Lafleur. However, Nilan and Skrudland would both be sidelined due to injury. As a result of criticism of Milbury's picks, the league's board of governors quickly stated that future teams would be chosen by committee.

One immediate effect of this was the ability for the league president (after 1993, the commissioner) to appoint two "senior" players to honor their years in the game (one for each team) - Guy Lafleur and Bobby Smith were the first two stars appointed in this manner. Previously, while the NHL president often selected soon-to-be retiring stars to the game (for instance, the 1980 game featured Gordie Howe, Phil Esposito, and Jean Ratelle at the request of coach Scotty Bowman), this became a tradition starting in 1991.

The other change, which would not happen until a year later, was because only two goaltenders were selected for the all-star game: as Edmonton Oilers coach John Muckler also coached the Campbell squad, many were considerably irked when Oilers goalie Bill Ranford was chosen over Chicago's own Ed Belfour, who was at the time the best goaltender that season, leading to the Chicago fans booing Ranford when he replaced starter Mike Vernon in the second period. To avoid this, Muckler suggested that three goaltenders should be selected in the future, with each goaltender playing a period - and the league made it so.

The War on Fighting
The 42nd classic was broadcast not only in the U.S. and Canada, but for soldiers abroad fighting in Operation Desert Storm, and players wore decals on their helmets as a symbolic gesture of support. However, some, like Wayne Gretzky (whose grandfather was a veteran of World War I and whose cousin was abroad at the time), called for the game to be canceled. Gretzky, however, was more adamant on the state of fighting in the NHL, saying that he was continually tired of sportscasters stating that "it looks like a hockey game out there" when a bench-clearing brawl takes place in other sports.

American broadcaster NBC broke away from the telecast in the third period to televise a briefing from The Pentagon involving the Gulf War. SportsChannel America included the missing coverage in a replay of NBC's telecast (NBC owned 50% of Rainbow Enterprises, the parent of SportsChannel America).

Heroes' Fall
Unlike the previous year, the Heroes of Hockey game was contested between Blackhawks alumni and the "best of the rest", akin to the all-star games of old. However, it was without its boycotters. Joining Gordie Howe were some of the greatest players of all, including Bobby Orr, Ted Lindsay, and Frank Mahovlich (Bobby Hull was also notably opposed, but played anyway due to the game being in Chicago). At the center of this argument, however, were pensions: the National Hockey League Alumni Association believed that there was a $12 million pension surplus in which they were entitled to, and one of the more convincing arguments to support their case was that 26-year veteran Howe was being paid only $1200 per month from this pension fund - noticeably below what he would have gotten if he had pursued a career elsewhere, as he noted.

Super Skills Competition
The Wales Conference won its first Super Skills competition in All-Star Game history, although the majority of the individual events was won by Campbell Conference participants.  Even though Al MacInnis won the Hardest Shot event he was 3 mph off of breaking Al Iafrate's mark that was set in the 1990 Super Skills.  However, Mark Messier and Patrick Roy would establish new individual events records.

Individual Event winners
 Accuracy Shooting - Mark Messier (Edmonton Oilers) - 4 hits, 6 shots
 Hardest Shot - Al MacInnis (Calgary Flames) - 94.0 mph
 Goaltenders Competition - Patrick Roy (Montreal Canadiens) - 2 GA, 25 shots

The game
Toronto Maple Leafs' left winger Vincent Damphousse scored four goals as the Campbell Conference defeated the Wales Conference 11–5 in front of a sell-out crowd at Chicago Stadium and a worldwide television audience that was the largest in All-Star Game history.  Damphousse tallied three of his four goals in the third period to be named All-Star M.V.P. and would become just the third player in All-Star Game history to record 4 goals in a game, which is shared by Wayne Gretzky and Mario Lemieux.  Damphousse's performance also overshadowed a five-point performance by St. Louis Blues center Adam Oates who recorded one goal and four assists in the game.

Summary

 National anthems: Wayne Messmer  (CAN), Wayne Messmer (USA)
 Referee: Terry Gregson
 Linesmen: Jerry Pateman, Dan Schachte
 TV: NBC, TSN, SRC

Rosters

See also
1990–91 NHL season

Notes
 Brett Hull was voted as a starter, but was unable to play due to injury.  Adam Oates was his replacement.
 Chris Nilan and Brian Skrudland were named to the Wales team, but did not play.
 Larry Robinson was named to the Campbell team, but did not play.
  It was at this game, where the tradition of cheering during the United States National Anthem prior to every Chicago Blackhawks game was introduced to the Nation.  The practice had been a Hawks tradition at Chicago Stadium since the 1985 semi-finals against the heavily-favored Edmonton Oilers during the Wayne Gretzky dynasty. This tradition carried over to the United Center and is still done today before all Blackhawks' home games. Blackhawks' fans also kept with this tradition for their 2 home Bridgestone Winter Classic and Stadium Series games (2009 at Wrigley Field and 2014 at Soldier Field).

References

All-Star Game
National Hockey League All-Star Games
Ice hockey competitions in Chicago
National Hockey League All
1990s in Chicago